Glisnica is a village in the municipality of Pljevlja, Montenegro.

Demographics
According to the 2003 census, the village had a population of 152 people.

According to the 2011 census, its population was 139.

References

Populated places in Pljevlja Municipality